Okoia is a small rural community approximately 5 km east of Whanganui, New Zealand. It is centred on the Okoia Primary School and village.  The area is predominantly subject to sheep and beef pastoral farming, but in recent years some farms have been divided into lifestyle blocks.

The local Kauangāroa Marae and Kimihia te Maramatanga meeting house, 20km away on the Whangaehu river, are a meeting place for the local Māori iwi of Ngāti Apa.

Education

Okoia School is a co-educational state primary school for Year 1 to 8 students, with a roll of 60 as of 2019.

References

Whanganui District
Populated places in Manawatū-Whanganui